The Canadian city of Calgary, Alberta, is home to a relatively deep-seated tradition of winter sports. Much of this stems from its location, with proximity to the Alberta Rocky Mountains and Banff National Park. After hosting the 1988 Winter Olympics, the city has also had winter sports and training facilities. Beyond winter sports, Calgary has a number of professional and amateur sports teams and is a major world pro rodeo centre, with the city's Stampede Park holding the annual Calgary Stampede.

Calgary boasts a variety of sport leagues in the summer and winter seasons. Australian football, basketball, cricket, field hockey, futsal, ice hockey, lacrosse, netball, soccer, sailing, and volleyball are all available in various locations throughout Calgary.

Sports facilities

Calgary hosted the 1988 Winter Olympic Games. Many of the Olympic facilities continue to function as major high performance training facilities. Among the most notable of these are WinSport's Canada Olympic Park and the Olympic Oval.

Athletes also take advantage of the high altitude to improve their physical limit. With facilities that are considered to be world-class and proximity to the Canadian Rockies, Calgary attracts athletes from all over Canada and around the world for winter sport training.

Calgary's multipurpose arena, the Scotiabank Saddledome was formerly known as the Olympic Saddledome. The Saddledome was the first modern arena in North America capable of accommodating an Olympic regulation-sized ice rink. Calgary's primary open-air stadium, McMahon Stadium, was the site of the opening and closing ceremonies of the Olympics and is currently the venue for Calgary's Canadian Football League team, the Calgary Stampeders. The stadium has a capacity of 35,400 and is the fifth largest in Canada.

The Olympic Oval is primarily a speed-skating arena that can also accommodate hockey and high-performance training. The rink's ice is world-renowned, and it brings some of the best speed skaters in the world to the facility for training and competition. The Oval has often been touted as having "the fastest ice on Earth" due to the fact that it is a climate-controlled facility and because of the effects of high altitude on the ice surface. As a result, many world records have been broken there. It was at this place where the likes of Catriona Le May Doan and Cindy Klassen trained for their Olympic and world stardom.

Golf is also a popular sport in Calgary.  Major courses include Heritage Pointe, Priddis Greens, the Glencoe Golf and Country Club and the Calgary Golf and Country Club (these have been ranked among the top 100 in Canada).  Calgary is also within a short drive to many top rated mountain courses including Banff Springs, Kananaskis and Stewart Creek.

Two Soccer domes, located in SE and NW Calgary allow for indoor play.

Other sporting venues include:

 Father David Bauer Olympic Arena
 Foothills Stadium
 Spruce Meadows
 Stampede Corral
 Stampede Park Race Track and Grandstand
 Max Bell Centre
 Glenmore Velodrome
 Don Hartman Northeast Sportsplex

Recreational and park facilities

Calgary is next to some of the most visited natural scenery in the world. Banff National Park is about 125km northwest of Calgary on the Trans-Canada Highway. 30km west of the city is the town of Bragg Creek. Another 45km west of Bragg Creek is the Kananaskis Improvement District featuring hiking, horseback riding and mountain-biking trails, camping sites, rock and ice climbing, and cross country skiing.  A Provincial shooting range for firearms is located on the highway to Kananaskis.

Many Calgarians and millions of tourists enjoy activities such as biking, hiking, skiing, snowboarding, mountainboarding, camping, and fishing in these parks every year. The town of Banff hosts nearly five million visitors annually.

Fish Creek Provincial Park, one of Canada's largest provincial park located within a major city
Nose Hill Park
Inglewood Bird Sanctuary
Stanley Park
Prince's Island Park
Prairie Winds Park
Bowness Park
Edworthy Park
Battalion Park
Confederation Park
Kananaskis Provincial Improvement District, approximately 60 km to the west and southwest
Banff National Park, approximately 130 km to the west, UNESCO World Heritage Site

Notable sporting events
Calgary hosts a number of annual sporting events. This includes the CSIO Spruce Meadows 'Masters' Tournament, one of the richest show jumping events in the world, is held annually in September at Spruce Meadows. The Calgary Stampede is an annual rodeo held at Stampede Park, and includes a number of equestrian sporting events.

Calgary hosted the following major North American and International sporting events including:

 1972 World Figure Skating Championships
 1975 63rd Grey Cup
 1980 Labatt Brier
 1985 37th NHL All-Star Game
 1985 BWF World Championships
 1986 Stanley Cup Finals
 1988 Winter Olympics
 1989 Stanley Cup Finals
 1990 FIL World Luge Championships
 1992 FIBT World Championships (Men's skeleton)
   1993 FIL World Luge Championships
 1993 81st Grey Cup
 1996 FIBT World Championships
 1996 Special Olympics Canada Winter Games
 1997 Labatt Brier
 1997 World Police and Fire Games
 2000 88th Grey Cup
 2001 FIBT World Championships (Women's bobsleigh, men's and women's skeleton)
 2001 FIL World Luge Championships
 2002 Nokia Brier
 2004 Stanley Cup Finals
 2005 FIBT World Championships
 2006 World Allround Speed Skating Championships
 2006 World Figure Skating Championships
 2009 Tim Hortons Brier
 2009 97th Grey Cup
 2012 World Junior Ice Hockey Championships
 2015 Tim Hortons Brier
 2019 107th Grey Cup
2021 Scotties Tournament of Hearts
2021 Tim Hortons Brier
2021 BKT Tires & OK Tire World Men's Curling Championship
2021 LGT World Women's Curling Championship
2021 IIHF Ice Hockey Women's World Championship
Calgary also bid for the 1964, 1968, and the 1972 Winter Olympics

Sports

Cycling

Both Calgary and the Canadian Rockies are destinations for cycling and mountain biking. Within Calgary, a large bike path network exists (nearly 600km) as part of the city's transportation infrastructure. It is used extensively both for commuting to work and for recreation as it connects most of the city's parks. Large parks such as Fish Creek Provincial Park and Nose Hill Park are also major destinations for cyclers.

In the summer, Canada Olympic Park functions as a venue for both cross-country and downhill cycling. The Glenmore Velodrome is an outdoor track facility in the city. The Calgary BMX Association also operates a BMX racing track near Blackfoot Trail.

There is a general cycling advocacy group, Bike Calgary.

Ice hockey

Calgary is home to the professional NHL team, the Calgary Flames and their AHL affiliate team the Calgary Wranglers who moved to Calgary in 2022 and will play their inaugural season in Calgary in 2022–23. Calgary is also home to several junior hockey clubs, including an entire junior "B" league, the Calgary Junior Hockey League. The city also plays host to Midget AAA World Invitational Tournament hockey tournament.

Professional wrestling
Calgary is also the home of the Hart wrestling family and the Hart House which previously housed "The Dungeon", a famous pro wrestling training camp founded by Stu Hart, the family patriarch, where he trained many wrestlers including all of his sons, most notably Bret and Owen Hart.

Sport teams

Major league sports teams

Minor league sports teams

Amateur and junior clubs

Defunct and former teams

See also
 Canada's Sports Hall of Fame
 Sports in Canada